Masashige Narusawa (Narusawa Masashige; 29 January 1925 – 13 February 2021) was a Japanese screenwriter and director.

Biography
Narusawa was best known for writing screenplays for the last films of director Kenji Mizoguchi, including The Woman in the Rumor, Princess Yang Kwei Fei, Shin Heike Monogatari, and Street of Shame. He directed six films and wrote over 80 screenplays between 1949 and 1975.

Masashige Narusawa died in Tokyo on 13 February 2021 at the age of 96.

Filmography

Screenwriter
The Scarlet Gang of Asakusa (1952)
Tange Sazen (1952)
The Wild Geese (1953)
The Woman in the Rumor (1954)
Princess Yang Kwei Fei (1955)
Shin Heike Monogatari (1955)
Street of Shame (1956)
 (1959)
 (1961)
Love Under the Crucifix (1962)
Black Lizard (1968)
Curse of the Blood (1968)

Director
Yojōhan monogatari: Shōfu shino (1966)
Portrait of Madame Yuki (1975)

Television
The Scent of Incense (1965)
Playgirl (1970)

References

1925 births
2021 deaths
Japanese screenwriters
People from Nagano Prefecture